The name Krosa has been used to name four tropical cyclones in the western north Pacific Ocean. The name was contributed by Cambodia and means crane.

 Typhoon Krosa (2001) (T0120, 24W) – a storm that never affected land.
 Typhoon Krosa (2007) (T0715, 17W, Ineng) – struck Taiwan and China.
 Typhoon Krosa (2013) (T1329, 29W, Vinta) – struck the Philippines and affected Vietnam.
 Typhoon Krosa (2019) (T1910, 11W) — struck Japan as a tropical storm.

Pacific typhoon set index articles